The Bagauda Dynasty is a house of noblemen who founded and ruled the Kingdom (eventually Sultanate) of Kano throughout its existence. The Dynasty spanned over 800 years spread out through ten centuries, one of the longest in recorded human history and produced 43 kings. After the fall of the dynasty in Kano, the remnants of the royal house founded a new kingdom in the Maradi Region.

History 
The dynasty started with the first King of Kano, Bagauda in 999 CE and lasted until 1807 CE when the last ruler from the lineage, Muhammad Alwali II was assassinated in exile during the Fulani War. Their reign started after Bagauda migrated to Kano and conquered the indigenous pagans of Dala Hill, although the rest of Kano would not fall under their control until during the reign of his early successors.

The dynasty is divided into three factions or eras, the Gaudawa, the Rumfawa and the Kutumbawa, but their lineage can all be traced to Bagauda according to the Kano Chronicle. They are said to have descended from Bawo, the son of Hausa folk hero Bayajidda and his wife, the last Kabara, Magajiya Daurama.The arrival of Bagauda is said to have fulfilled the prophecy of Barbushe.

Gaudawa 
The Gaudawa's reign was characterized by the conquest and consolidation of what is now known as Kano State by Bagauda and his earliest descendants. Their era was characterized by mostly war and expansion by the rulers and also the construction of the Kano Walls. They also laid the foundation of the Kano administrative system and revolutionized its Military along with imposing Islam as the State religion. The Gaudawa are also known as "Daurawa".

Rumfawa 
The Rumfawa oversaw the zenith of the Kano Sultanate. With the opening of trade routes a few decades earlier in the time of Abdullahi Burja, Muhammad Rumfa and his descendants were able to propel the State to the peak of its commercial and political influence. This saw a wave of immigrants from other parts the Sahel as well as the venture of Kano's citizens into other parts of the region, asserting the State as a major trading center. Their reign culminated in the complete subordination of all of Hausaland by Kano during the reign of Rumfa's Grandson, Muhammad Kisoki. The Rumfawa made the most important administrative and social reforms in Kano.

Kutumbawa 
The Kutumbawa era began in 1623, starting with Muhammad Alwali I, famously known as El Kutumbi. This era saw dwindling fortunes for the Sultanate. The Kutumbawa faced various waves of famine (possibly due to environmental degradation), indecisive wars by increasingly aggressive neighbors, and had to deal with internal strife within the Kano Royal House. Ravaged by economic and political crises, the Kutumbawa saw the fall of Kano's founding dynasty.

Genealogy

See also
List of rulers of Kano

References

History of Nigeria by period
Kano State